Sahitya Akademi Award is given each year, since 1955, by Sahitya Akademi (India's National Academy of Letters), to writers and their works, for their outstanding contribution to the upliftment of Indian literature and Konkani literature in particular.

When the Sahitya Akademi recognised Konkani in 1975 as an independent and literary language, one of the important factors was the literary heritage of Romi Konkani since the year 1556. However, after Konkani in the Devanagari script was made the official language of Goa in 1987, the Sahitya Akademi has supported only writers in the Devanagari script.

Winners

References

Sahitya Akademi Award

Konkani